Kenneth James Armitage (23 October 1920 – 1952), also known as Ken Fenton, was an English professional footballer who played in the Football League for Leyton Orient and Oldham Athletic as a centre half.

References 

Clapton Orient F.C. wartime guest players
English Football League players
English footballers
Leyton Orient F.C. players
Association football wing halves
1920 births
1952 deaths
Footballers from Sheffield
Barnsley F.C. players
Gainsborough Trinity F.C. players
Oldham Athletic A.F.C. players
Ashton United F.C. players
Tottenham Hotspur F.C. wartime guest players
Portsmouth F.C. wartime guest players